WCRI-FM (95.9 FM; "Classical 95.9") is a classical music-formatted radio station on Block Island, Rhode Island, affiliated with the World Classical Network (WCN). The station is owned by Judson Group, Inc., a company that includes the son and grandsons of broadcasting pioneer Ted Jones, founder of Charles River Broadcasting and Boston classical music station WCRB.

History
The original construction permit for the station was granted on October 16, 1990, with the call sign WVBI assigned on November 30.  The station signed on June 13, 1994, though the license to cover was not issued until April 12, 1995.

The station has always had a classical format. WVBI initially had a limited programming schedule mainly from the now-defunct Classic FM network. The station's signal had trouble covering even Block Island.  Charles River Broadcasting acquired WVBI in early 1999, at which point it was renamed WCRI.  The station then performed upgrades, affiliating with WCN which was commonly owned with WCRI. A new tower was constructed in 2001 which also enabled stereo broadcasting. Translator station W243AI (96.5) in Newport, Rhode Island had relayed Charles River Broadcasting flagship WCRB since the translator's sign-on in 1996, and it carried WCRI's programming for several years before becoming a WMVY translator in 2004.

Charles River Broadcasting announced on October 27, 2005, that it was exploring the sale of its properties, with Judson Group, Inc. purchasing WCRI and sister station WCNX in 2006.  Judson Group, Inc., includes the son (Christopher Jones) and grandsons (Jamie Jones and Jefferey Jones) of broadcasting pioneer Ted Jones, founder of Charles River Broadcasting Company and classical music station, WCRB.

WCRI began to simulcast on 1180 AM, replacing WCNX on October 1, 2011; to reflect this, the station added the "-FM" suffix on September 8, 2011. (The AM station was sold to Red Wolf Broadcasting Corporation in 2014, and dropped the WCRI-FM simulcast for a Red Wolf-programmed oldies format under the WSKP call sign in December 2013.)

References

External links

CRI-FM
Classical music radio stations in the United States
New Shoreham, Rhode Island
Washington County, Rhode Island
Radio stations established in 1994
1994 establishments in Rhode Island